Various national databases of United States persons, and their activities, have been compiled by government and private entities. Different data types are collected by different entities for different purposes, nominal or otherwise. These databases are some of the largest of their kind, and even the largest ever.
Accessibility of government databases may be controlled by various means, such as requirement of a warrant, subpoena, or simple request from another branch of government.  Commercial databases are generally established for profit. Some other databases are available for free usage with various states across the United States. Typical instances include Colorado Resident Directory and many others out there on the internet. Data breaches may occur as a result of a vulnerability or publication in error.

Databases

Government

Private

See also
 Government database
 Mass surveillance

References

Mass surveillance
Government databases
Automatic number plate recognition